Imperativ (internationally released as Imperative) is a 1982 German drama film written and directed by Krzysztof Zanussi.

The film entered the competition at the 39th Venice International Film Festival, where it received the Special Jury Prize.

Cast 
 Robert Powell: Augustin
 Brigitte Fossey: Yvonne
 Sigfrit Steiner: the professor
 Matthias Habich: the theologist
 Leslie Caron: the mother
 Jan Biczycki: the orthodox priest

References

External links

1982 films
1982 drama films
German drama films
Films directed by Krzysztof Zanussi
Films scored by Wojciech Kilar
Venice Grand Jury Prize winners
West German films
English-language German films
1980s German films